Joseph Légaré (March 10, 1795 – June 21, 1855) was a painter and glazier, artist, seigneur and political figure in Lower Canada.

Early life
The eldest son in a family of six children, Joseph Légaré was born in Quebec City, the son of a cobbler also called Joseph and Louise Routier, and was educated at the Petit Séminaire de Québec. The financial success of his father as a business man was augmented by extra loans he made and properties rented out. The family became relatively wealthy as a result. The young Joseph spent three years of study at the Seminaire de Quebec but he discontinued his studies in July 1811. On 19 May 1812 he was apprenticed as a painter and glazier with Moses Pierce.
Joseph Légaré died at 60

Middle period
On 21 April 1818 Légaré married Geneviève Damien. He owned part of the fief of Saint-François from 1827 to 1841. A self-taught artist, he began painting reproductions of European religious works and later produced his own paintings, receiving a medal from the Société pour l’Encouragement des Sciences et des Arts en Canada in 1828. He was the first landscape artist of French-Canadian origin. In 1833, Légaré opened his own gallery in Quebec City, the first art gallery in Canada; it closed two years later. In 1838, he opened another gallery in partnership with lawyer Thomas Amiot. Légaré served as a member of the municipal council for the city and the board of health; he also served as a justice of the peace. In 1842 he helped found the Saint-Jean-Baptiste Society at Quebec and gathered signatures for a petition in support of the Ninety-Two Resolutions. Légaré was an unsuccessful candidate for a seat in the legislative assembly in 1848 and 1850.

The Connoisseur
On the municipal and provincial levels, Légaré's political engagement did not preclude an active role within the cultural life of his time. His activities both as collector and propagandist for art qualify him not merely as a pioneer but as one of the "very first connoisseurs". The "Desjardins Collection" had an enormous influence on his career and he purchased thirty of the works using a loan provided by his father in July 1819. These thirty works formed the nucleus of his collection. The majority of his later acquisitions came through Johan Christopher Reiffenstein and G.D. Balzaretti, two Quebec merchants.

Historical paintings
Légaré painted a number of works depicting the "customs of North American Indians". However, some of his more memorable works include: First Monastery of the Ursulines at Quebec, Memorials of the Jesuits of New France, The Martyrdom of Brothers Brebeuf and Lalement and The Battle of Sainte-Foy.

Later years
The overall achievement of Légaré contrasts with that of his prolific contemporaries Roy-Audy, Antoine Plamondon and Theophile Hamel. Légaré's relative financial freedom allowed him to paint as he pleased without having to worry about saleability. He sold several works to parish churches and religious orders but did not always find a ready market for his works. Many of his landscapes "were all but rejected by his fellow countrymen, as other of his works were, because of his political opinions". Many of his supporters were "as newspapers of the day often emphasized, foreigners". He was named to the Legislative Council of the Province of Canada in February 1855 and died in office in Quebec City at the age of 60.

The 1980 film A Québécois Rediscovered: Joseph Légaré 1795-1855 was made about his life.

Footnotes

References

 Entry from the Canadian Encyclopedia

External links
 Artist's gallery at the National Gallery of Canada
 The Burning of the Parliament Building in Montreal, painting, oil on wood, about 1849, at the McCord Museum

1795 births
1855 deaths
Members of the Legislative Council of the Province of Canada
Artists from Quebec